Kashi Yatra refers to the yatra (pilgrimage) to the city of Kashi (Varanasi) in Hinduism. Regarded to be among the holiest of cities in Hinduism, pilgrims undertake a journey to this city due to the belief that it would allow them to achieve mukti (salvation). The significance of this pilgrimage is explained in the Skanda Purana. Kashi is referred to as an important tirtha (holy site) in Hindu literature, with the Kashi Vishwanath temple of the city considered to be among the most sacred sites dedicated to the deity Shiva.

It also refers to a name of a ceremony during a Hindu wedding: A bridegroom expresses the desire to become an ascetic and undertake a pilgrimage to Kashi, carrying slippers, an umbrella, a bamboo fan, and other objects that may vary according to regional traditions. While he walks away from the wedding mandapa, the bride's father persuades the bridegroom to return, and marry his daughter.

Circuits
There are a number of routes or circuits that pilgrims may choose to undertake in the city within the Kashi Yatra:
 Panchakroshi Yatra
 Jala Tirtha Yatra
 Shivayatan Yatra
 Antargrihi Yatra
 Gauri Yatra
 Durga Devi Yatra
 Ekadasha Maharudra Yatra
 Navagraha Yatra

See also
 Yatra
 Famous Hindu yatras
 Hindu pilgrimage sites in India
 Padayatra
 Ratha Yatra

References

External links
 District Varanasi Official Website – Official website of Varanasi District.

Hindu rituals
Pilgrimage routes
Varanasi